The Royal Rider is a 1929 American silent Western film directed by Harry Joe Brown and written by Sylvia Bernstein, Jacques Jaccard and Leslie Mason. The film stars Ken Maynard, Olive Hasbrouck, Philippe De Lacy, Theodore Lorch, Joseph Burke and Harry Semels. The film was released by Warner Bros. on February 17, 1929.

Cast    
 Ken Maynard as Dick Scott
 Olive Hasbrouck as Ruth Elliott
 Philippe De Lacy as King Michael XI
 Theodore Lorch as Prime Minister
 Joseph Burke as Kings Tutor
 Harry Semels as Parvene
 Billy Franey as Wild West Show Member 
 Frank Rice as Wild West Show Member
 Bobby Dunn as Wild West Show Member
 John Sinclair as Wild West Show Member 
 Ben Corbett as Wild West Show Member 
 Tarzan as Tarzan

References

External links
 

1929 films
1920s English-language films
1929 Western (genre) films
First National Pictures films
Warner Bros. films
Films directed by Harry Joe Brown
American black-and-white films
Silent American Western (genre) films
1920s American films